Chang Tak Ching (born 22 January 1995) is a Hong Kong badminton player. He, partnered with Ng Wing Yung, participated in the 2021 BWF World Championships' mixed doubles event, and defeated the top seeds and the defending champions Zheng Siwei and Huang Yaqiong in the second round by 16–21, 21–13, 21–17.

Achievements

BWF International Challenge/Series (3 runners-up) 
Mixed doubles

  BWF International Challenge tournament
  BWF International Series tournament
  BWF Future Series tournament

References

External links 
 

1995 births
Living people
Hong Kong male badminton players